Slightly Scarlet is a 1930 American pre-Code comedy drama film directed by Louis J. Gasnier and Edwin H. Knopf and starring Evelyn Brent and Clive Brook. The film was shot in several different language versions, with different casts. The French version was titled L'énigmatique Mr. Parkes, and stars Claudette Colbert as Lucy and Adolphe Menjou as Parkes.

Cast
 Evelyn Brent as Lucy Stavrin
 Clive Brook as Hon. Courtenay Parkes
 Paul Lukas as Malatroff
 Eugene Pallette as Sylvester Corbett
 Helen Ware as Corbett's Wife
 Virginia Bruce as Enid Corbett
 Henry Wadsworth as Sandy Weyman
 Claud Allister as Albert Hawkins
 Morgan Farley as Malatroff's Victim
 André Cheron as Butler (uncredited)
 Georges Renavent as Inspector (uncredited)
 Rolfe Sedan as Gendarme (uncredited)
 Charles Sullivan as Chauffeur (uncredited)

References

External links

1930 films
1930 comedy-drama films
1930 multilingual films
American comedy-drama films
American black-and-white films
American multilingual films
Films directed by Louis J. Gasnier
Films directed by Edwin H. Knopf
Paramount Pictures films
Films with screenplays by Joseph L. Mankiewicz
Films with screenplays by Howard Estabrook
1930s English-language films
1930s American films